Slovak records in swimming are the fastest ever performances of swimmers from Slovakia, which are recognised and ratified by the Slovak Swimming Federation (Slovenská plavecká federácia).

All records were set in finals unless noted otherwise.

Long Course (50 m)

Men

Women

Mixed relay

Short Course (25 m)

Men

Women

Mixed relay

References
General
Slovak Records 18 December 2022 updated
Specific

External links
Slovak Swimming Federation web site
All-time bests Slovakia swimrankings.net 5 January 2022 updated

Slovakia
Records
Swimming
Swimming